Abagrotis trigona, the luteous dart, is a moth of the family Noctuidae. The species was first described by Smith in 1893. It is found in North America from western South Dakota and south-western Manitoba west across southern Saskatchewan and Alberta to Vancouver Island, south to the Mexican border. There is also a disjunct population in Ohio.

The wingspan is 28–30 mm. Adults are on wing in August.

External links

trigona
Moths of North America
Moths described in 1893